This table of works by the English composer Eugene Aynsley Goossens initially lists them by opus number. They are sortable by other criteria, such as title, key, year of composition, and text authors.

Table of compositions

List of compositions 

SIR EUGENE GOOSSENS: A CATALOGUE OF THE ORCHESTRAL AND CHORAL MUSIC

1911-12: Variations on a Chinese Theme for orchestra, op.1: 27 minutes     +  (ABC Classics cd)
1911:   Miniature Fantasy for string orchestra, op.2: 8 minutes
1912:   Symphonic Poem “Perseus”, op.3
1913:   “The Eternal Rhythm” for orchestra, op.5: 20 minutes   + (ABC Classics cd)
1916:   Two Sketches for clarinet and strings: 7 minutes
1917:   “Four Conceits” for orchestra, op.20: 8 minutes
1917-18: “Tam O’Shanter”-Scherzo after Burns for orchestra, op.17a: 3 minutes     +  (ABC Classics cd)
1919:   “By the Tarn” for string orchestra, op.15, No.1: 5 minutes   *    + (EMI cd)
             “Jack O’Lantern” for string orchestra, op.15, No.2
             Prelude to “Philip II” for small orchestra, op.22: 9 minutes
             Lyric Poem for Violin and Orchestra, op.35: 7 minutes
c.1922:“Silence”-A choral fragment for chorus and orchestra, op.31: 8 minutes
1922:   Sinfonietta, op.34: 15 minutes
1923:   Phantasy Sextet for Strings for string orchestra, op.37
1927:   Rhythmic Dance for orchestra, op.30: 3 minutes
             Three Greek Dances for small orchestra, op.44: 14 minutes
1927-29:Oboe Concerto, op.45: 12 minutes    + (ABC Classics and ASV cds cd)
1928:   Concertino for double string orchestra, op.47: 13 minutes   + (ABC Classics cd)
1929:   “Judith” for orchestra (Ballet music from the Opera)        + (Dutton cd)
1930:   Variations on “Cadet Roussel” for orchestra: 3 minutes   + (Dutton cd)
1933:   Suite “Kaleidoscope” for orchestra, op.18: 9 minutes   + (ABC Classics and Signum cds)
1935:   Three Pictures for Flute and Orchestra, op.55: 18 minutes
             Intermezzo from “Don Juan de Manara” for orchestra: 5 minutes
1938-40:Symphony No.1, op.58: 39 minutes   *   + (ABC Classics and Chandos cds)
1942:   Pastorale for string orchestra, op.59: 8 minutes
        Phantasy Concerto for Piano and Orchestra, op.60: 25 minutes      + (Chandos cd)
        Cowboy Fantasy for orchestra, op.61
1943-45:Symphony No.2, op.62: 38 minutes    *    + (ABC Classics and Chandos cds)
1944: Fanfare for the Merchant Marine for brass ensemble and percussion, Duration: 3 minutes
1945:   Victory(Jubilee) Fanfare and ‘God Save The Queen’ for orchestra: 4 minutes
1948:   Phantasy Concerto for Violin and Orchestra, op.63: 22 minutes (Chandos cd)
1949 Iberia Suite, Three movements arranged for orchestra, Duration: 15 minutes
1953:   Coronation Fanfare for orchestra
             “The Apocalypse” for soprano, contralto, tenor, bass, double chorus and orchestra, op.64: 110 minutes     *
1956-60: Divertissement for orchestra, op.66: 18 minutes     + (ABC Classics cd)
1958:   Concert Piece for two harps, oboe, cor anglais and orchestra, op.65: 22 minutes     +  (ABC Classics cd)
“Star-Spangled Banner” for orchestra: 4 minutes
Two Nature Poems for orchestra: 12 minutes
1941: Hommage à Paderewski: 2:22
1960: Capriccio, piano: 2:33
1960: Forlane and toccata, piano: 2:28
Sheep-Shearing Song, piano, op.38: No. 1. Folk-Tune: 3 minutes

External links
  
  
 

 
Goossen, Eugene Aynsley